Stardemon is a 1989 role-playing game adventure for GURPS published by Steve Jackson Games.

Plot summary
Stardemon is an adventure which is set on the planet of Anson, and involves an archeological expedition into the jungle.

Publication history
Stardemon: Spacefarers Unlock an Ancient Secret was written by Greg Porter, and was published by Steve Jackson Games in 1989 as a 32-page book.

Reception
Paul Mason reviewed Stardemon for Games International magazine, and gave it 3 stars out of 5, and stated that "While it's not the kind of thing to buy for ideas, if try to run a reasonably standard science fiction campaign Stardemon provides a useful stop-gap scenario which could set up several recurring plot themes."

References

GURPS books
Role-playing game adventures
Role-playing game supplements introduced in 1989